Hillside is a township in Union County, in the U.S. state of New Jersey. As of the 2020 United States census, the township's population was 22,456, an increase of 1,052 (+4.9%) from the 2010 census count of 21,404, which in turn reflected a decline of 343 (−1.6%) from the 21,747 counted in the 2000 census.

Hillside was incorporated as a township on April 3, 1913, from portions of Union Township, based on the results of a referendum held on April 29, 1913. The township was named for the surrounding hills.

The township is split between area codes 908 and 973.

History
Hillside was created from parcels of land carved out of neighboring Newark, Elizabeth, and Union. It originally contained the farms of Woodruff, Conant and Saybrook. Local streets still bear their names.

Hillside was incorporated shortly after the appearance of Halley's Comet in 1910, and for that reason, the team nickname of Hillside High School was made the "Comets" when the high school opened in 1940. Several local businesses take the name "Comet" for the same reason.

The Hillside Historical Society was established in the 1980s in the Woodruff home on Conant Street, perhaps the township's oldest. The Woodruff House and Eaton Store Museum is operated and maintained by the Hillside Historical Society. Purchased by the society in 1978, the house has been faithfully restored to its original grandeur. The Woodruff House spans three centuries in one structure, including the original 1735 building, the 1790 addition, the 1890s kitchen and the 1900s store. The society has also added to the grounds an authentic post and beam barn, a Phil Rizzuto and All Sports Museum honoring the Hillside legend as well as an archive to house the many documents the society has obtained over the years.

Jean-Ray Turner, a reporter for the Elizabeth Daily Journal, wrote Along the Upper Road in the 1970s, a book of the history of Hillside.

Hillside has been the home of Bristol-Myers Squibb. Lionel Trains were manufactured from 1929 to 1974 at a factory located in Hillside that employed as many as 2,000 employees. The town thrived for decades and reached an economic peak in the 1960s. Blue collar workers who lived primarily in the central part of town were employed in local manufacturing concerns. White collar workers established the neighborhood known as Westminster where Yankee shortstop and broadcaster Phil Rizzuto lived for most of his adult life, until his death. That section of town also included the private Pingry School for boys (which left the township) and is now the East Campus of Kean University.

In the 1950s and 1960s the township was approximately one-half Jewish, many of whom lived either in Westminster or in the area of Hillside near Chancellor Avenue, adjacent to the Weequahic section of Newark, which was the early home of comedian Jerry Lewis and writer Philip Roth (Portnoy's Complaint).

In the early 1950s the township established Conant Park, its largest. The park is bounded by the Elizabeth River and Conant Street. At the rear area of the park near Pingry School was the boundary of the Kean Estate, the boyhood home of Governor Thomas Kean (1982–1990). The wealthy Kean family also donated the land on Morris Avenue and helped to establish Newark Normal College in 1885, which was renamed Kean College, and later Kean University, in the family's honor. Also in the 1950s the Town Hall, Police Headquarters and Municipal Library were constructed at the corner of Liberty and Hillside Avenues.

Township organizations include Rotary International, Kiwanis, Knights of Columbus, Elks, the Hillside Industrial Association, the Hillside Business and Professional Women's Club, the Republican Club and the Democratic Club, as well as a number of ethnic clubs and associations.

In 1991, police from both Hillside and Newark fired nearly 40 shots at a van that had rammed a Hillside police vehicle after a high-speed chase. The pursuit had started after the van had been reported stolen at gunpoint in Newark and was being followed by three Newark police cars before crossing into Hillside. Two of the people inside the vehicle were killed and four of the five other passengers were wounded, though the Union County Prosecutor indicated that there was no clear explanation for why the police had started shooting. The Reverend Al Sharpton held a rally outside Town Hall on Hillside Avenue demanding that the police officers involved in the shootings should be prosecuted for their actions.

Geography
According to the United States Census Bureau, the township had a total area of 2.78 square miles (7.20 km2), including 2.77 square miles (7.17 km2) of land and 0.02 square miles (0.04 km2) of water (0.54%).

Unincorporated communities, localities and place names located partially or completely within the township include Lyons Farms and Saybrooke.

The township is located on the northern edge of Union County and is bordered to the northwest by Irvington and to the north and northeast by Newark, both in Essex County. Elizabeth borders Hillside to the east and southeast, while Union borders to the west.

Climate
The climate in this area is characterized by hot, humid summers and generally mild to cool winters. According to the Köppen Climate Classification system, Hillside has a humid subtropical climate, abbreviated "Cfa" on climate maps.

Demographics

2010 census

The Census Bureau's 2006–2010 American Community Survey showed that (in 2010 inflation-adjusted dollars) median household income was $55,520 (with a margin of error of +/− $5,760) and the median family income was $67,492 (+/− $5,643). Males had a median income of $44,421 (+/− $3,088) versus $42,927 (+/− $4,392) for females. The per capita income for the township was $35,486 (+/− $3,349). About 9.4% of families and 11.7% of the population were below the poverty line, including 15.7% of those under age 18 and 13.3% of those age 65 or over.

2000 census
As of the 2000 United States census there were 21,747 people, 7,161 households, and 5,578 families residing in the township. The population density was 7,793.6 people per square mile (3,009.5/km2). There were 7,388 housing units at an average density of 2,647.7 per square mile (1,022.4/km2). The racial makeup of the township was 40.03% White, 46.54% African American, 0.23% Native American, 3.45% Asian, 0.08% Pacific Islander, 5.26% from other races, and 4.41% from two or more races. Hispanic or Latino of any race were 14.50% of the population. As of the 2000 Census, an adjusted 11.2% of residents listed themselves as being of Portuguese ancestry, the third-highest in New Jersey among communities in which more than 1,000 residents recorded an ancestry group.

There were 7,161 households, out of which 36.0% had children under the age of 18 living with them, 53.5% were married couples living together, 18.8% had a female householder with no husband present, and 22.1% were non-families. 18.0% of all households were made up of individuals, and 7.7% had someone living alone who was 65 years of age or older. The average household size was 3.04 and the average family size was 3.45.

In the township the population was spread out, with 25.6% under the age of 18, 8.9% from 18 to 24, 30.3% from 25 to 44, 24.1% from 45 to 64, and 11.1% who were 65 years of age or older. The median age was 36 years. For every 100 females, there were 88.3 males. For every 100 females age 18 and over, there were 84.2 males.

The median income for a household in the township was $59,136, and the median income for a family was $64,635. Males had a median income of $39,439 versus $31,817 for females. The per capita income for the township was $21,724. About 3.2% of families and 5.3% of the population were below the poverty line, including 5.4% of those under age 18 and 9.1% of those age 65 or over.

Economy
Portions of the township are part of an Urban Enterprise Zone (UEZ), one of 32 zones covering 37 municipalities statewide. Hillside was selected in 1996 as one of a group of seven zones added to participate in the program. In addition to other benefits to encourage employment and investment within the UEZ, shoppers can take advantage of a reduced 3.3125% sales tax rate (half of the % rate charged statewide) at eligible merchants. Established in May 1996, the township's Urban Enterprise Zone status expires in May 2027.

Arts and culture
Musical groups from Hillside include Blanks 77, a street punk band.

Government

Local government
Hillside is governed by the Faulkner Act (formally known as the Optional Municipal Charter Law), under the Mayor-Council form of New Jersey municipal government (plan 4), as implemented as of July 1, 1997. The township is one of 71 municipalities (of the 564) statewide that use this form of government. The governing body is composed of the mayor and the seven-member Township Council, all elected to four-year terms of office on a non-partisan basis as part of the November general election in odd-numbered years. Four council members come from wards, and three are elected at-large. The four ward seats all come up for election together and the mayoral and at-large seats come up for vote together two years later. The council voted in August 2010 to shift municipal elections from May to November, to be held in conjunction with the general election.

, the Mayor of Hillside is Dahlia O. Vertreese, whose term of office ends December 31, 2025. Members of the Township Council are Council President Craig Epps (At-large, 2025), Vice President Christopher D. Mobley (Ward 2, 2023), Lisa Bonnano (At-large, 2025), Donald DeAugustine (Ward 3, 2023), Gerald Pateesh Freedman (Ward 4, 2023), Andrea Hyatt (Ward 1, 2023), and Robert Rios (At-large, 2025).

In the 2017 general election, none of the candidates for mayor or at-large council seats crossed the threshold, leading to a December run-off between Dahlia Vertreese and Jorge A. Batista, the two top candidates for mayor, and the top six for council, consisting of the three-person slates affiliated with the two mayoral candidates. The runoff was won by Vertreese and her slate.

Federal, state and county representation
Hillside is located in the 10th Congressional District and is part of New Jersey's 20th state legislative district. Prior to the 2011 reapportionment following the 2010 Census, Hillside had been in the 29th state legislative district.

 

Union County is governed by a Board of County Commissioners, whose nine members are elected at-large to three-year terms of office on a staggered basis with three seats coming up for election each year, with an appointed County Manager overseeing the day-to-day operations of the county. At an annual reorganization meeting held in the beginning of January, the board selects a Chair and Vice Chair from among its members. , Union County's County Commissioners are 
Chair Rebecca Williams (D, Plainfield, term as commissioner and as chair ends December 31, 2022), 
Vice Chair Christopher Hudak (D, Linden, term as commissioner ends 2023; term as vice chair ends 2022),
James E. Baker Jr. (D, Rahway, 2024),
Angela R. Garretson (D, Hillside, 2023),
Sergio Granados (D, Elizabeth, 2022),
Bette Jane Kowalski (D, Cranford, 2022), 
Lourdes M. Leon (D, Elizabeth, 2023),
Alexander Mirabella (D, Fanwood, 2024) and 
Kimberly Palmieri-Mouded (D, Westfield, 2024).
Constitutional officers elected on a countywide basis are
County Clerk Joanne Rajoppi (D, Union Township, 2025),
Sheriff Peter Corvelli (D, Kenilworth, 2023) and
Surrogate Susan Dinardo (acting).
The County Manager is Edward Oatman.

Politics
On March 2011, there were 11,991 registered voters in Hillside Township, of whom 6,196 (51.7% vs. 41.8% countywide) were registered as Democrats, 685 (5.7% vs. 15.3%) were registered as Republicans and 5,109 (42.6% vs. 42.9%) were registered as Unaffiliated. There was one voter registered to other parties. Among the township's 2010 Census population, 56.0% (vs. 53.3% in Union County) were registered to vote, including 73.4% of those ages 18 and over (vs. 70.6% countywide).

In the 2012 presidential election, Democrat Barack Obama received 8,059 votes (86.4% vs. 66.0% countywide), ahead of Republican Mitt Romney with 1,186 votes (12.7% vs. 32.3%) and other candidates with 23 votes (0.2% vs. 0.8%), among the 9,323 ballots cast by the township's 12,982 registered voters, for a turnout of 71.8% (vs. 68.8% in Union County). In the 2008 presidential election, Democrat Barack Obama received 7,908 votes (83.3% vs. 63.1% countywide), ahead of Republican John McCain with 1,491 votes (15.7% vs. 35.2%) and other candidates with 33 votes (0.3% vs. 0.9%), among the 9,492 ballots cast by the township's 12,766 registered voters, for a turnout of 74.4% (vs. 74.7% in Union County). In the 2004 presidential election, Democrat John Kerry received 6,415 votes (77.7% vs. 58.3% countywide), ahead of Republican George W. Bush with 1,737 votes (21.0% vs. 40.3%) and other candidates with 41 votes (0.5% vs. 0.7%), among the 8,257 ballots cast by the township's 11,702 registered voters, for a turnout of 70.6% (vs. 72.3% in the whole county).

In the 2013 gubernatorial election, Democrat Barbara Buono received 67.8% of the vote (3,362 cast), ahead of Republican Chris Christie with 31.6% (1,564 votes), and other candidates with 0.6% (31 votes), among the 5,370 ballots cast by the township's 12,816 registered voters (413 ballots were spoiled), for a turnout of 41.9%. In the 2009 gubernatorial election, Democrat Jon Corzine received 4,236 ballots cast (77.1% vs. 50.6% countywide), ahead of Republican Chris Christie with 1,085 votes (19.8% vs. 41.7%), Independent Chris Daggett with 102 votes (1.9% vs. 5.9%) and other candidates with 32 votes (0.6% vs. 0.8%), among the 5,492 ballots cast by the township's 12,413 registered voters, yielding a 44.2% turnout (vs. 46.5% in the county).

Education
The Hillside Public Schools serve students in pre-kindergarten through twelfth grade. As of the 2018–19 school year, the district, comprised of six schools, had an enrollment of 3,123 students and 260.7 classroom teachers (on an FTE basis), for a student–teacher ratio of 12.0:1. Schools in the district (with 2018–19 enrollment data from the National Center for Education Statistics) are 
Abram P. Morris Early Childhood Center (636 students; in grades Pre-K–1), 
Calvin Coolidge Elementary School (205; grade 2), 
Hurden Looker School (461; 3–4), 
George Washington School (488; grade 5), 
Walter O. Krumbiegel Middle School (452; 6–8) and 
Hillside High School (842; 9–12). Hillside High School on Liberty Avenue was originally constructed in 1941, replacing the Coe Avenue (A.P. Morris) School which became a grammar school. Additions were later added to accommodate the baby-boomers of the 1950s and 1960s. In the mid-sixties the high school held some 1,500 students.

Catholic grammar schools included Christ the King on Columbia Avenue and St. Catherine of Siena School in Elizabeth on North Broad Street until the two were merged in 2004 to form Hillside Catholic Academy with the students from both schools together at the facility on Bloy Street. The school was one of eight closed by the Roman Catholic Archdiocese of Newark at the end of the 2011–2012 school year, in the face of declining enrollment and rising expenses, part of a long-term reduction in the number of schools in the archdiocese, which had dropped to 112 from the 176 schools systemwide a decade earlier.

A portion of Kean University is located in the Westminster section of Hillside, on the grounds of the former Pingry School.

Transportation

Roads and highways

The Garden State Parkway, Interstate 78, U.S. Route 22, New Jersey Route 439 and County Route 509 all pass through Hillside. The Union toll plaza of the Garden State Parkway is located on the northbound lanes of the parkway, approaching the interchange for I-78.

Public transportation
NJ Transit offers bus service to the Port Authority Bus Terminal in Midtown Manhattan on the 114 route and to other New Jersey points. There is one train line that passes through the township but there are no stations. The Irvington Industrial Branch of the Lehigh Valley Railroad (now Conrail Shared Assets) breaks off of the mainline to serve several industries. The closest train stations are Union station in Union, and North Elizabeth station in Elizabeth.

Notable people

People who were born in, residents of, or otherwise closely associated with Hillside include: 

 William Bendix (1908–1964), actor (Lifeboat, Life of Riley), lived here in the 1930s
 Clint Bolick (born 1957), associate justice of the Arizona Supreme Court
 Marquis Cunningham (born 1989), finalist on So You Think You Can Dance
 Michael V. Gazzo (1923–1995), playwright (A Hatful of Rain) and Academy Award-nominated film actor (The Godfather Part II)
 David Jones (born 1968), former NFL tight end who played for the Los Angeles Raiders in 1992
 Marc Leepson (born 1945), journalist and historian
 Kyle Lofton (born 1999), college basketball player for the St. Bonaventure Bonnies
 Rollie Massimino (1934–2017), college basketball coach, led Villanova to 1985 NCAA Men's Division I Basketball Championship
 Jerron McMillian (born 1989), NFL safety for the Green Bay Packers
 Mr. Len (Leonard "Lenny" Smythe), hip-hop artist, former member of underground group Company Flow, current member Roosevelt Franklin
 Adrienne A. Mandel (born 1936), politician who represented the 19th District in the Maryland House of Delegates for more than ten years
 Xavier Munford (born 1992), basketball player for Hapoel Tel Aviv of the Israeli Basketball Premier League
 Kendall Ogle (born 1976), 1999 draft pick of NFL's Cleveland Browns
 Robert Parham (born 1966), kickboxing former World Kickboxing Champion and actor
 Alan Paul (born 1949), member of The Manhattan Transfer
 Tab Ramos (born 1966), footballer and member of the United States' 1990 and 1994 World Cup teams; Hillside was childhood home
 Nicholas Reale (1922–1984), watercolorist with a lengthy career in art and teaching
 Phil Rizzuto (1917–2007), Hall of Fame baseball player and broadcaster; longtime Hillside resident
 Arthur Seale (born 1946), serving life sentence for 1980s kidnapping, murder of Exxon oil executive Sidney Reso
 Ralph H. Spanjer (1920–1999), U.S. Marine Corps major general
 Marquis Spruill (born 1991), football linebacker
 Dan Studney (born 1941), former track and field athlete who competed in the javelin throw, winning a gold medal for the United States at the 1963 Pan American Games
 Tame One (born 1970 as Rahem Brown), hip-hop artist and member of supergroup The Weathermen
 Jeff Tittel, environmentalist who spent more than two decades as the director of the New Jersey Sierra Club
 Harry Wilf (1921–1992), co-founder of the real estate development firm Garden Homes
 Joseph Wilf (1925–2016), co-founder of the real estate development firm Garden Homes
 Zygi Wilf (born 1950), real estate developer, principal owner of NFL's Minnesota Vikings, younger brother Mark Wilf (born 1962), president of the Vikings and cousin Leonard Wilf (born 1947), the team's vice chairman
 Hela Young (1950–2002), Miss New Jersey 1971, former New Jersey Lottery host
 Dick Zimmer (born 1944), former member of the United States House of Representatives, Republican candidate for United States Senate in 1996 and 2008

Evergreen Cemetery
Hillside is the site of Evergreen Cemetery, known locally as the burial site of many Roma (or Gypsy) families and a number of notable writers, including:
 Stephen Crane, author of The Red Badge of Courage
 Mary Mapes Dodge, author of Hans Brinker or The Silver Skates
 Edward Stratemeyer, creator of the Hardy Boys, Bobbsey Twins, Nancy Drew, Rover Boys, and Tom Swift series, among others

The Evergreen Cemetery was mentioned in Weird NJ for an incident in 1902, when after a downpour, bodies were found on the streets.

Pop culture
 Hip hop artist Lauryn Hill mentions Hillside on her album The Miseducation of Lauryn Hill. In the song "Every Ghetto, Every City," in which she describes her experiences growing up in New Jersey, she raps, "Hillside brings beef with the cops."
 The 1978 film King of the Gypsies was filmed in part in Hillside.
 The Rat Slayer of Hillside, NJ, a documentary about Hillside resident Frank Balun who was charged for killing a rat, features the township.

References

External links

 Official website
 Hillside Public Schools
 
 School Data for the Hillside Public Schools, National Center for Education Statistics

 
1913 establishments in New Jersey
Faulkner Act (mayor–council)
New Jersey Urban Enterprise Zones
Populated places established in 1913
Townships in Union County, New Jersey